Xianyang North Road Subdistrict is a subdistrict situated on northern Hongqiao District, Tianjin, China. It shares border with Tianmu Town to the north and west, Dingzigu Subdistrict to the east, and Xiyuzhuang Subdistrict to the south. It had 74,799 inhabitants as of 2010.

The subdistrict was established in 1980. Its name comes from Xianyang North Road that runs through the subdistrict.

Geography 
Xianyang North Road subdistrict is situated on the southern bank of the Grand Canal.

Administrative divisions 
By the end of 2021, Xianyang North Road Subdistrict had 16 residential communities. They are listed in the table below:

See also 

 List of township-level divisions of Tianjin

References 

Township-level divisions of Tianjin
Hongqiao District, Tianjin